Hanshan may refer to:

Hanshan (poet) (寒山), a figure associated with a collection of poems from the Tang Dynasty
Hanshan Deqing (憨山德清), a Buddhist monk from the Chinese Ming Dynasty
Mountain Cry (）, 2015 Chinese film

PR China
Hanshan County (含山县), of Chaohu City, Anhui
Hanshan District (邯山区), Handan, Hebei
Hanshan Temple (寒山寺), Buddhist temple and monastery in Suzhou
 (韩山镇), town in Shuyang County, Jiangsu